Barnet Fair is an annual horse and pleasure fair held near Mays Lane, Barnet, England, on the first Monday in September.
 
The Fair takes place over three days starting on 4 September. It still operates under its royal Charter which is issued by Barnet council. The focus in the present-day Fair is no longer on horses and other livestock; but it is rather a pleasure fair instead.

History
The fair began in 1588 when Queen Elizabeth I granted a charter to the Lord of the Manor of Barnet to hold a fair twice yearly, in addition to the weekly Barnet Market. Originally held in June and October, Lord John Tomlinson changed the dates to April and September in 1758 for the reason of improving business. From 1881, the April fair ceased.

The focus of the fair was its livestock, with animals being brought from across the United Kingdom. In 1834, The Times reported that Barnet Fair was England's largest cattle market, with up to 40,000 animals on display.

From the eighteenth century, the festivities also used to include horse racing, although these ceased in 1870 when the railway station was built on the ground in which they had been held.

Popular culture
In 1896, a film was made about Barnet Fair, entitled Barnet Horse Fair.

The term 'Barnet Fair', normally shortened to 'Barnet', has become rhyming slang for 'hair'.

"Barnet Fair" is the name of a song by Steeleye Span.

See also

References

External links

1588 establishments in England
Recurring events established in 1588
Fairs in England
September events
History of the London Borough of Barnet
Chipping Barnet
Equestrian festivals
Festivals established in 1588
 Charter fair
Autumn events in England